Andaryan is a village in Varzaqan county in East Azerbaijan Province in northwest Iran. It is located 101 km northeast of the provincial capital Tabriz. People are more involved in farming. This village is also famous because of the gold mine in its vicinity.

References

Varzaqan County